Greg Anderson (born 1970) is an American musician, a co-founder of Southern Lord Records. 

Anderson is the guitarist of stoner doom band Goatsnake, but is also well known for his collaborations with Stephen O'Malley. Together, the duo participated in projects such as the short-lived death/doom metal band Thorr's Hammer, the extreme doom metal band Burning Witch (although Anderson left before the band could record an album), as well as the drone metal bands Sunn O))) and Teeth of Lions Rule the Divine.

Career
Earlier in his career, Anderson was involved with the straight edge hardcore punk bands False Liberty, Brotherhood, Amenity, Statement, Galleon's Lap, and the Revelation Records and indie rock/hardcore punk band Engine Kid.

Both Brotherhood and Galleon's Lap featured future Foo Fighters and Sunny Day Real Estate bass player Nate Mendel.

In 2007, Greg joined Attila Csihar and Oren Ambarchi in a new drone-doom project called Burial Chamber Trio, as well as Ascend, a current project/record with Gentry Densley, the former singer-guitarist of Revelation Records band Iceburn.

In April 1998, Anderson and O'Malley founded the independent, underground label Southern Lord Records, based in Los Angeles, California. The company specializes in doom, sludge, drone, experimental metal, left-field black metal, and, more recently, crust punk.

Discography

With The Lord
Forest Nocturne (2022)
Devotional (collaboration with Petra Haden, 2022)

With False Liberty
 The Zoo Is Free (Demo 1986)
 Silence Is Consent... 7" (EP 1986)

With Brotherhood
 Brotherhood of Friends (1988)
 Words Run... As Thick As Blood (1989)

With Amenity
 Chula Vista (Demo 1989)

With Statement
 Don't Sacrifice Me 7" (EP 1989)

With Galleons Lap
 Themes And Variations (1991)

With Engine Kid
 Engine Kid (EP 1992)
 Astronaut (EP 1993)
 Bear Catching Fish (CD and LP 1993)
 The Little Drummer Boy/In The Bleak Midwinter (split with Silkworm 1993)
 Three On The Tree (split with Wreck 1994)
 Iceburn/Engine Kid (split CD with Iceburn 1994)
 Angel Wings (CD 1995)
 Troubleman Unlimited (EP 1995)

With Thorr's Hammer 
 Sannhet i Blodet (Demo 1995)
 Dommedagsnatt (Cassette 1996, CD 1998, CD Reissue 2004, Picture Disc 2004)

With Goatsnake 
 IV 7" (EP 1998)
 Man Of Light 7" (EP 1998)
 Goatsnake Vol. 1 (CD 1999)
 Goatsnake/Burning Witch (split with Burning Witch) (CD 2000)
 Dog Days (CD 2000)
 Flower of Disease (2000)
 Trampled Under Hoof (CD 2004)
 1 + Dog Days (CD 2004)
 "Black Age Blues" (CD 2016)

With Sunn O))) 
 The Grimmrobe Demos (demo 1998, CD 2000, 2xPLP 2003, 2xLP 2004)
 ØØ Void (2000)
 Flight of the Behemoth (2002)
 White1 (2003)
 White2 (2004)
 Black One (2005)
 Altar (Collaboration with Boris, CD 2006)
 Oracle (2007)
 Dømkirke (live 2xLP 2008)
 Monoliths & Dimensions (2009)
 Terrestrials (collaboration with Ulver, February 2014)
 Soused (collaboration with Scott Walker, October 2014)
 Kannon (2015)
 Life Metal (2019)

With Teeth of Lions Rule the Divine 
 Rampton (2002)

With Burial Chamber Trio 
 Burial Chamber Trio (LP 2007)
 WVRM 10" (Live EP 2008)

With Ascend 
 Ample Fire Within (2008)

With Pentemple

 Sunn O))) Presents … (Live album, 2008)

References

 Sunn O))) Exclusive Interview Transcripts: Greg Anderson – The Wire

External links 
 Southern Lord Homepage
 Southern Lord MySpace Webpage
 An Extensive audio interview with Anderson about his music and label on the Jekyll and Hyde Show, 106FM Jerusalem

American heavy metal guitarists
Living people
1970 births
American male guitarists
California Breed members
Sunn O))) members
Burning Witch members
Thorr's Hammer members
Goatsnake members
21st-century American guitarists
21st-century American male musicians
Teeth of Lions Rule the Divine members